Diomar Ángel Díaz Calderón (born 3 March 1990) is a footballer from Guasdualito, Venezuela. He plays for Atlético Bucaramanga.

Career
Díaz began his career in Venezuela with Deportivo Petare and Mineros de Guayana, scoring four goals in 43 appearances with Deportivo Petare and three goals in 16 appearances with Mineros de Guyana before signing with NASL club New York Cosmos on 2 May 2013.

Díaz made his debut for the Cosmos in the opening match of the 2013 NASL Fall season on 3 August 2013, which ended in a 2–1 victory over the Fort Lauderdale Strikers.  Three weeks later, Díaz scored his first goal for the Cosmos in a 2–1 victory over the San Antonio Scorpions.

Díaz went on to score five goals in 13 appearances for the Cosmos during the 2013 season, on the way to winning the 2013 NASL Fall title and NASL Soccer Bowl over the Atlanta Silverbacks 1–0. He finished the regular season tied with Marcos Senna for most goals scored on the team and was named to the NASL Team of the Week in Weeks 8, 9, and 11.

Díaz battled a variety of injuries during the 2014 season which limited his playing time. He finished the regular season strongly however, scoring in the team's 2–1 victory over Ottawa Fury FC on 11 October 2014 and appearing in all six of the team's final regular season matches. He finished the 2014 regular season with one goal in 12 appearances (8 starts) for the Cosmos. Díaz was named to the NASL Fall Team of Week 14 for his goal in the team's 2–1 win over Ottawa.

References

External links
 New York Cosmos bio
 

1990 births
Living people
Association football forwards
Venezuelan expatriate footballers
Venezuelan footballers
Atlético Venezuela C.F. players
Caracas FC players
Deportivo Miranda F.C. players
A.C.C.D. Mineros de Guayana players
New York Cosmos (2010) players
Jaguares de Córdoba footballers
North American Soccer League players
Venezuelan Primera División players
Categoría Primera A players
People from Guasdualito
Venezuelan expatriate sportspeople in the United States
Venezuelan expatriate sportspeople in Colombia
Expatriate soccer players in the United States
Expatriate footballers in Colombia